Harry Murphy (26 August 1920 – second ¼ 1981) was an English professional rugby league footballer who played in the 1930s, 1940s and 1950s.

Background
Harry Murphy's birth was registered in Wakefield, West Riding of Yorkshire, England, and he died aged 60 in
Wakefield, West Yorkshire, England. The pub called "Harry's Bar" at 107B Westgate, Wakefield is named after Harry Murphy.

Playing career

International honours
Harry Murphy won caps for England while at Wakefield Trinity in 1946 against France, and Wales, and a cap for Great Britain while at Wakefield Trinity in 1950 against Australia.

County Honours
Harry Murphy was selected for Yorkshire County XIII while at Wakefield Trinity during the 1948/49 season.

County Cup Final appearances
Harry Murphy played left-, i.e. number 11, in Wakefield Trinity’s 2-5 defeat by Bradford Northern in the 1945–46 Yorkshire County Cup Final during the 1945–46 season at Thrum Hall, Halifax on Saturday 3 November 1945, played right-, i.e. number 12, in the 10–0 victory over Hull F.C. in the 1946–47 Yorkshire County Cup Final during the 1946–47 season at Headingley Rugby Stadium, Leeds on Saturday 31 November 1946, played left- in the 7–7 draw with Leeds in the 1947 Yorkshire County Cup Final during the 1947–48 season at Fartown Ground, Huddersfield on Saturday 1 November 1947, and played left- in the 8–7 victory over Leeds in the 1947–48 Yorkshire County Cup Final replay during the 1947–48 season at Odsal Stadium, Bradford on Wednesday 5 November 1947.

Club career
Harry Murphy made his début for Wakefield Trinity during April 1940, and he played his last match for Wakefield Trinity during October	1952	, he appears to have scored no drop-goals (or field-goals as they are currently known in Australasia), but prior to the 1974–75 season all goals, whether; conversions, penalties, or drop-goals, scored 2-points, consequently prior to this date drop-goals were often not explicitly documented, therefore '0' drop-goals may indicate drop-goals not recorded, rather than no drop-goals scored. In addition, prior to the 1949–50 season, the archaic field-goal was also still a valid means of scoring points.

Contemporaneous Article Extract
One of the many “home-grown” players who have made the full journey from the City Schools R.L. to the international arena.  with St. Austin’s School, became a forward with Trinity's own junior side. Joined Trinity 1937. In post-war football he went on to play for England, Yorkshire and Great Britain, touring twice.

"…(Bob) Kelly joined Trinity from Keighley R.L. in an exchange deal with Harry Murphy in season 1952-3…".

References

External links

1920 births
1981 deaths
Castleford Tigers players
England national rugby league team players
English rugby league players
Great Britain national rugby league team players
Keighley Cougars players
Rugby league locks
Rugby league second-rows
Rugby league players from Wakefield
Wakefield Trinity players
Yorkshire rugby league team players